The Constance Hopper, Bay of Constance or Constance Funnel is a bay in Lake Constance, to the east of Constance and north of Kreuzlingen.
The leading outflow of the Upper Lake is the Seerhein, which begins in the Constance hopper.

The Constance Hopper the only part of the Obersee, where a territorial boundary has been defined by the neighbouring states, in this case, Germany and Switzerland.

The Dominicans Island is located in the Constance Hopper.  It is part of the city of Constance.

References 

Bays of Germany
Geography of Lake Constance
Landforms of Baden-Württemberg